Pierre-Alexandre Parenteau (born March 24, 1983) is a Canadian former professional ice hockey right winger. 

In the National Hockey League (NHL) he played for the Chicago Blackhawks, New York Rangers, New York Islanders, Colorado Avalanche, Montreal Canadiens, Toronto Maple Leafs, New Jersey Devils and Nashville Predators, and then finished his career with Avtomobilist Yekaterinburg of the Kontinental Hockey League (KHL). He was originally drafted by the Mighty Ducks of Anaheim in the ninth round, 264th overall, in the 2001 NHL Entry Draft, though he never made an appearance for the team.

Playing career

Mighty Ducks of Anaheim
Parenteau was drafted by the Mighty Ducks of Anaheim in the ninth round, 264th overall, of the 2001 NHL Entry Draft. During his tenure with the organization, Parenteau never appeared in a game for the club.

Chicago Blackhawks
On December 28, 2006, Parenteau was traded from the Ducks, along with Bruno St. Jacques, to the Chicago Blackhawks in exchange for Sébastien Caron, Matt Keith and Chris Durno. He spent majority of the season in the American Hockey League (AHL) with the Norfolk Admirals, recording 51 points in 40 games. Parenteau also made his NHL debut during the 2006–07 season with the Blackhawks, playing in five games by season's end.

New York Rangers
On October 11, 2007, Parenteau was traded to the New York Rangers in exchange for a conditional seventh-round pick in 2008.

In 2009–10, after starting the season with the Rangers' American League affiliate, the Hartford Wolf Pack, Parenteau was recalled to New York and scored his first NHL goal in his first game with the Rangers against Dwayne Roloson of the New York Islanders on October 28, 2009.

New York Islanders
With two more extended stints with the Rangers throughout the season, Parenteau posted eight points in 22 games, producing enough league-wide interest to earn him a free agent contract from the New York Islanders for one-year on July 2, 2010.
 
Parenteau made the Islanders' opening night roster out of training camp and found a permanent spot on the top line alongside John Tavares and Matt Moulson. After establishing himself with the Islanders, Parenteau was quickly signed to a one-year extension on February 17, 2011. At the end of his first full season in the NHL, he scored 20 goals and 53 points, finishing the season second in scoring for the Islanders.

With the ambition to build upon his break-out season, Parenteau followed up his success in the 2011–12 season, producing 49 assists and 67 points to finish third amongst the Islanders in scoring.

Colorado Avalanche
On July 1, 2012, Parenteau signed, as an unrestricted free agent, to a four-year contract with the Colorado Avalanche. With the lock-out-shortened 2012–13 season delaying his Colorado debut, Parenteau later scored his first goal for the Avalanche in a 3–1 home opening victory over the Los Angeles Kings on January 22, 2013. He scored in the Avalanche's first four home games, becoming the first Avalanche to do so since Peter Forsberg and Chris Drury in 2000–01. On February 14, 2013, in a 4–3 shootout victory over the Minnesota Wild, Parenteau appeared in his 200th career NHL game. In participating in every game for the Avalanche that season, he recorded a career-best points-per-game average to lead the team with 18 goals and co-lead, alongside linemate Matt Duchene, with 43 points.

Montreal Canadiens
On June 30, 2014, Parenteau was traded, along with a fifth-round draft pick in 2015, to the Montreal Canadiens in exchange for Daniel Brière. In the 2014–15 season with the Canadiens, Parenteau was hampered by injury and occasions of healthy scratches, to finish with an output on 22 points in 56 games. On June 28, 2015, Parenteau was placed on unconditional waivers by the Canadiens for the purpose of buying the final year of his contract out. Having cleared waivers, the next day he was formally bought out and released to free agency.

Toronto Maple Leafs
Following his buyout, Parenteau signed a one-year contract with the Toronto Maple Leafs on July 1, 2015. Parenteau cited head coach Mike Babcock as the main reason for the signing. The two had previously worked together within the Mighty Ducks organization more than a decade earlier. Parenteau's year in Toronto was arguably his best season since 2012–13 season as he finished second in team scoring and first for goals scored on a rebuilding Maple Leafs team that finished last place in the NHL. Parenteau's play lead him to be included among lists of most likely players to be traded come the February 29, 2016, trade deadline, however, the Maple Leafs were unable to move Parenteau, likely due to an injury suffered a few days prior. As the season came to an end, Parenteau spoke highly of his time in Toronto, saying it was "the best I've felt in the last three years." He added his wish to re-sign with the team in the offseason.

Return to the Islanders, New Jersey Devils and Nashville Predators

On July 3, 2016, Parenteau signed a one-year deal with the New York Islanders, a team he had previously played for between 2010 and 2012, but was waived on October 10, 2016. He was claimed off waivers by the New Jersey Devils on October 11, 2016. Upon joining the Devils, Parenteau joined the likes of Sergei Nemchinov, Arron Asham, and Kevin Weekes as being one of a few players to complete the Hudson River Triple (being a member of the Rangers, Islanders and Devils). In the 2016–17 season, Parenteau continued his scoring rate in producing 13 goals and 27 points in 59 games.

With the Devils falling in the standings, he was traded at the NHL deadline to join his 8th NHL club, the Nashville Predators in exchange for a sixth-round draft pick on March 1, 2017. Parenteau appeared in 8 regular season games with the club, scoring one assist. He also skated in five playoff games. The Predators made it to the 2017 Stanley Cup Finals, but were eliminated by the Pittsburgh Penguins.

Avtomobilist Yekaterinburg and retirement
Parenteau as a free agent from the Predators, was unsigned over the summer before agreeing to a professional tryout contract with the Detroit Red Wings on September 6, 2017. Following the training camp and preseason, Parenteau was released by the Red Wings without a contract offer. On November 1, 2017, he signed for the remainder of the 2017–18 season with Russian outfit, Avtomobilist Yekaterinburg of the Kontinental Hockey League (KHL). On June 14, 2018, Parenteau announced his retirement.

Personal life
He is the cousin of former NHL player, Pierre-Marc Bouchard.

Career statistics

Regular season and playoffs

International

Awards and honours

References

External links
 

1983 births
Living people
Anaheim Ducks draft picks
Augusta Lynx players
Avtomobilist Yekaterinburg players
Canadian ice hockey right wingers
Chicago Blackhawks players
Chicoutimi Saguenéens (QMJHL) players
Cincinnati Mighty Ducks players
Colorado Avalanche players
French Quebecers
Hartford Wolf Pack players
Ice hockey people from Gatineau
Moncton Wildcats players
Montreal Canadiens players
Nashville Predators players
New Jersey Devils players
New York Islanders players
New York Rangers players
Norfolk Admirals players
Portland Pirates players
Sherbrooke Castors players
Toronto Maple Leafs players
Canadian expatriate ice hockey players in Russia